Dollars and Sense may refer to:

 Dollars & Sense, a magazine focusing on economics
 Dollars and Sense (TV series), a Canadian business affairs television series
 Dollars and Sense (film), a 1920 American silent drama film